Vice Admiral Sanjay Jasjit Singh, AVSM, NM is a serving Flag officer in the Indian Navy. He served as the Deputy Chief of Integrated Defence Staff (Operations) (DCIDS Ops). Previously, he served as the Commandant of the Naval War College, Goa and as the Flag Officer Commanding Western Fleet.

Early life and education
Singh was born in an Armed Forces family and is third-generation officer. He graduated from the National Defence Academy, Pune where he was adjudged the best naval cadet. He was awarded the Binoculars as the Best Sea Cadet as well as the Sword of Honour.

Naval career 
Singh was commissioned into the Indian Navy on 1 July 1986. He is a specialist in Navigation and Direction, a course he topped in 1992. He has served as the navigation officer on most classes of ships. In 2000, he was selected to attend the Advanced Command and Staff Course at the Joint Services Command and Staff College (JSCSC), Shrivenham in the United Kingdom. At JSCSC, he was adjudged the Best Overseas Student amongst 90 participants from about 50 countries. In his training appointments, he served as the staff officer ND of the P-15 Training Team, the Officer-in-Charge Local Work Up team (West), and as the Officer-in-Charge Navigation Direction School.

Singh commanded the Nilgiri-class frigate . For his command of the Taragiri, he was awarded the Nao Sena Medal. He then was appointed Joint Director of Personnel at Naval HQ. In 2009, he attended the higher command course at the College of Naval Warfare in Mumbai. He subsequently was appointed commanding officer of the Talwar-class guided missile frigate . After a successful command, he was appointed Naval attaché at the Embassy of India at Tehran, Iran.

In 2012, he attended the National Defence College, New Delhi. After completing the year-long course, he was appointed Principal Director Naval Operations at NHQ. Subsequently, he was appointed  Principal Director Strategy, Concepts and Transformation, also at NHQ.

Flag rank
On promotion to Flag Rank, Singh took over as the Assistant Chief of Naval Staff (Communication Space and Network Centric Operation). On 4 February 2018, he assumed the office of Flag Officer Sea Training (FOST) at Kochi. As FOST, his charter included the conduct of the operational sea training of all ships of the Indian Navy and the Indian Coast Guard. Singh assumed the office of the Flag Officer Commanding Western Fleet on 22 March 2019. For his command of the Western Fleet, Singh was awarded the Ati Vishisht Seva Medal on 26 January 2020.

On 18 February 2020, Singh took over as the Commandant of his alma mater, the Naval War College, Goa. After a one year stint, he was promoted to the rank of Vice Admiral and appointed Controller of Personnel Services (CPS) at Naval HQ. In August 2021, he was appointed Deputy Chief of Integrated Defence Staff (Operations) at HQ IDS.

Personal life
Singh is married to Zarine Singh. The couple have a daughter, Payal and a son, Samar.

Awards and decorations

Source:

See also
 Flag Officer Commanding Western Fleet
 Western Fleet

References 

Indian Navy admirals
Recipients of the Ati Vishisht Seva Medal
National Defence Academy (India) alumni
Flag Officers Commanding Western Fleet
Flag Officers Sea Training
Living people
Year of birth missing (living people)
National Defence College, India alumni
Recipients of the Nau Sena Medal
Indian naval attachés
Commandants of Naval War College, Goa
Graduates of Joint Services Command and Staff College